Rita's Last Fairy Tale is a 2012 Russian fantasy drama film directed by Renata Litvinova.

Plot 
The film tells three different women, one of whom the feeling of love is unknown, but she does not lose hope of finding her, despite the fact that unsuccessful dates almost killed her. The second is getting ready for the wedding after a planned medical examination. The third one works as a doctor, but she is unhappy and hates her husband.

Cast 
 Olga Kuzina as Rita
 Tatyana Drubich as Nadya
 Renata Litvinova as Tanya Neubivko
 Nikolay Khomeriki as Kolya
 Regina Ayrapetyan as Regina
 Mitya Borisov as Petro
 Lev Danilkin
 Sergey Debizhev
 Albina Evtushevskaya
 Alisa Khazanova as Alevtina Mihaylovna

References

External links 
 

2012 films
2010s Russian-language films
Russian fantasy drama films
Russian mystery films
2010s fantasy drama films